Pierre Cosme (born 1965) is a French historian and academic, specializing in ancient Rome.

Biography 
Pierre Cosme who graduated from the École normale supérieure de lettres et sciences humaines (class 1985), is agrégé d’Histoire and was a member of the École française de Rome from 1993 to 1996. His thesis focused on the uses of writing in the Roman army.

He was maître de conférences at the university of Poitiers and Pantheon-Sorbonne University, as well as at the IUFM of Paris. He has been a professor at the university of Rouen since September 2010.

Bibliography

Thesis 
1995: Armée et bureaucratie dans l’Empire romain (de la Guerre Sociale aux Sévères)

Selection of articles 
1993: "Le livret militaire du soldat romain", in Cahiers du centre Gustave Glotz, pp. 67–80
1994: "Les légions romaines sur le forum : recherches sur la colonnette Mafféienne", in Mélanges de l'École française de Rome, 106/1, 1994, pp. 167–196
2003: "Le châtiment des déserteurs dans l’armée romaine", in Revue historique de droit français et étranger, 81/3, p. 287-307

Participation to collective works 
2003: "Le cep de vigne du centurion, signe d'appartenance à une élite ?", in Mireille Cébeillac-Gervasoni and Laurent Lamoine, Actes du Colloque : Les élites et leurs facettes. Les élites locales dans le monde hellénistique et romain, organised by the University Clermont II-Blaise Pascal, l'U.M.R. 8585 and the École française de Rome, Rome-Clermont-Ferrand, CEFR-309 , pp. 339–348
2004: "L'évolution de la bureaucratie militaire romaine tardive : optiones, actuarii et opinatores", in Yann Le Bohec and Catherine Wolff, L'armée romaine de Dioclétien à Valentinien Ier, Actes du Congrès de Lyon (September 2002) », Lyon, Collection du Centre d'Études Romaines et Gallo-Romaines, Nouvelle série, n° 26, p.397-408.
2006: "Qui commandait l'armée romaine ?", in Ségolène Demougin, Xavier Loriot and Pierre Cosme, Actes du Colloque international : H.-G. Pflaum : un historien du XXe siècle, organised in Paris by the École pratique des hautes études in October 2004, Geneva, Droz, pp. 137–156
2007: "Les fournitures d'armes aux soldats romains", in Lukas de Blois and Elio Lo Cascio, The Impact of the Roman Army (200 BC - AD 476). Economic, Social, Political, Religious and Cultural Aspects. Proceedings of the Sixth Workshop of the International network Impact of Empire (Capri, March 29-April 2, 2005) , Leyde–Boston, Brill, 2007, pp. 239–260

Monographies 
1998: L’État romain entre éclatement et continuité, l'Empire romain de la mort de Commode au concile de Nicée (192–325), Seli Arslan, Paris, 
2005: Auguste, Perrin, 
2007: L'armée romaine, VIIIe siècle av JC - Ve siècle ap JC, Armand Colin, 
2011: Les empereurs romains, PUF, 
2011: Rome et son empire, Hachette, 
2011: L'année des quatre empereurs, Éditions Fayard 
2014: Auguste, maître du monde: Actium, 2 septembre 31 av. J-C,

External links 
 COSME Pierre on GRHis – Groupe de Recherche d'Histoire de l'Université de Rouen
 Une bataille pour l'Empire : "actium", mythe et réalité with Pierre Cosme 
 Auguste par Pierre Cosme on Agoravox

20th-century French historians
21st-century French historians
French scholars of Roman history
1965 births
Living people